Damon Jones (born September 30, 1994) is an American professional baseball pitcher in the Philadelphia Phillies organization.

Career
Jones attended Twin Falls High School in Twin Falls, Idaho and played college baseball at the College of Southern Idaho and Washington State University. He was drafted by the Philadelphia Phillies in the 18th round of the 2017 Major League Baseball draft.

Jones made his professional debut with the Williamsport Crosscutters, going 2–3 with a 4.85 earned run average (ERA) over 26 relief innings. He played 2018 with the Lakewood BlueClaws, pitching to a 10–7 record and 3.41 ERA in 23 games (22 starts).

Jones started 2019 with the Clearwater Threshers, with whom he was named a Florida State League All-Star, before being promoted to the Reading Fighting Phils in June and the Lehigh Valley IronPigs in July. Over 23 starts between the three clubs, Jones went 5-4 with a 2.91 ERA, striking out 152 over  innings.

The Phillies added Jones to their 40-man roster after the 2020 season. He did not play a minor league game in 2020 due to the cancellation of the minor league season caused by the COVID-19 pandemic.

On April 19, 2021, Jones was promoted to the major leagues for the first time. He was optioned down the next day without making an appearance. On July 11, Jones was again recalled to the majors after Alec Bohm, Connor Brogdon, Aaron Nola, and Bailey Falter were placed on the COVID-19 injured list. On July 16, Jones was again optioned down to Lehigh Valley without making an appearance. He made his MLB debut on August 10, pitching  of an inning against the Dodgers. He was outrighted off the roster on November 9, 2022.

Personal life
Jones’ grandfather, Darrall Imhoff, played in the NBA.

References

External links

1994 births
Living people
People from Twin Falls, Idaho
Baseball players from Idaho
Major League Baseball pitchers
Philadelphia Phillies players
Washington State Cougars baseball players
Williamsport Crosscutters players
Lakewood BlueClaws players
Clearwater Threshers players
Reading Fightin Phils players
Lehigh Valley IronPigs players